Cattle Raiders is a 1938 American Western film directed by Sam Nelson and written by Joseph F. Poland and Ed Earl Repp. The film stars Charles Starrett, Donald Grayson, Iris Meredith, Dick Curtis, Joseph Allen and Edward LeSaint. The film was released on February 12, 1938, by Columbia Pictures.

Plot
Tom returns, but finds out that he is now wanted, since his gun was found in a murder scene. Tom gets into a fight with Munro which he suspects his the murderer and collects a bullet from him, which he matches to the bullet used in the murder, however in the trial, the bullet evidence is ignored.

Cast          
Charles Starrett as Tom Reynolds
Donald Grayson as Slim Grayson
Iris Meredith as Nancy Grayson
Dick Curtis as Ed Munro
Joseph Allen as Steve Reynolds 
Edward LeSaint as John Reynolds
Edmund Cobb as Burke 
George Chesebro as Brand
Edward Coxen as Doc Connors
Steve Clark as Hank 
Art Mix as Keno 
Clem Horton as Slash

References

External links
 

1938 films
American Western (genre) films
1938 Western (genre) films
Columbia Pictures films
Films directed by Sam Nelson
American black-and-white films
Films with screenplays by Joseph F. Poland
1930s English-language films
1930s American films